Zhao Shuli (1906–1970) was a novelist and a leading figure of modern Chinese literature. He died in 1970, following persecutions during the Cultural Revolution.

Biography
Born in 1906 in Qinshui County, Shanxi Province, he was originally called 趙樹禮, which, in Mandarin Chinese, was a homophone of the name he later adopted in his adult career.

Zhao's major fictional works include 小二黑結婚 Xiao Erhei jiehun, "Little Erhei's Marriage";   李有才板話 Li Youcai banhua, "The Rhymes of Li Youcai"; 李家莊的變遷 Li jiazhuang de bianqian, "Change Comes to Li Family Village"; and 三里灣 Sanliwan, "Sanliwan Village".  The action of Zhao's novels typically takes place in the countryside of Northern China. In this setting, Zhao explores the dilemmas and conflicts of villagers who are facing growing social upheaval.  Zhao was renowned for achieving nuanced portrayals of the diverse cast of human characters which were to be found in provincial life. Zhao became known as a leader of the Shanyaodan (White Potato) rural realists, one of the most influential literary movements in mid-20th century China.

Zhao was a member of the executive committee of the Chinese Writers Union and also served as the director of the Society of Chinese Authors, the president of the Society of Chinese Poets, and an editor of the journals 曲藝 Quyi (Performing Arts) and 人民文學 Renmin Wenxue (People's Literature).  He was also appointed a representative to the Eighth National Congress of the Communist Party of China, and a deputy in the first, second, and third sessions of the National People's Congress.

He died in 1970, having fallen victim to the persecutions that were launched against intellectuals, artists, and other "undesirables" during the Cultural Revolution.

1906 births
1970 deaths
Delegates to the 3rd National People's Congress
Delegates to the 2nd National People's Congress
Delegates to the 1st National People's Congress
Politicians from Jincheng
People persecuted to death during the Cultural Revolution
20th-century Chinese novelists
Chinese male novelists
Chinese male short story writers
20th-century Chinese short story writers
Republic of China short story writers
Republic of China novelists
People's Republic of China politicians from Shanxi
Chinese Communist Party politicians from Shanxi
Short story writers from Shanxi